The Hunger Games: The Ballad of Songbirds and Snakes is an upcoming American science fiction action film directed by Francis Lawrence from a screenplay by  Michael Arndt and Michael Lesslie, based on the 2020 novel The Ballad of Songbirds and Snakes by Suzanne Collins. It is the fifth installment in The Hunger Games film series, serving as a prequel to The Hunger Games (2012). It stars Tom Blyth, Rachel Zegler, Josh Andres Rivera, Hunter Schafer, Jason Schwartzman, Burn Gorman, Peter Dinklage, and Viola Davis.

The film is scheduled for release theatrically in the United States on November 17, 2023, by Lionsgate.

Cast 
 Tom Blyth as Coriolanus "Coryo" Snow: A mentor for the upcoming 10th Hunger Games and future President of Panem.
 Rachel Zegler as Lucy Gray Baird: A tribute from District 12 who forms a connection with Coriolanus, and a member of the Covey, a traveling musician group.
 Josh Andres Rivera as Sejanus Plinth: A close friend of Snow, and the mentor to a tribute from District 2.
 Hunter Schafer as Tigris Snow: Coriolanus's cousin and confidante, who advises him in everything.
 Jason Schwartzman as Lucretius "Lucky" Flickerman: The television host for the 10th Hunger Games and ancestor to Caesar Flickerman, who would host later editions of the Games.
 Peter Dinklage as Casca Highbottom: Dean of the Academy and co-creator of the Hunger Games.
 Viola Davis as Dr. Volumnia Gaul: The head gamemaker of the 10th annual Hunger Games.
 Burn Gorman as Commander Hoff: The leader of the peacekeepers sent by the Capitol to District 12.
 Fionnula Flanagan as Grandma'am: Coriolanus Snow’s strict grandmother.
 Ashley Liao as Clemensia Dovecote: One of Coriolanus's closest friends, and a mentor to a tribute from District 11.
 Isobel Jesper Jones as Mayfair Lipp: The daughter of District 12's mayor and a rival of Lucy Gray.
 Dakota Shapiro as Billy Taupe: A member of the Covey and Lucy Gray's love-interest.
 Vaughan Reilly as Maude Ivory: A member of the Covey.
 George Somner as Spruce: A citizen from District 12.
 Carl Spencer as Smiley: A peacekeeper sent by the Capitol to District 12.
 Scott Folan as Beanpole: A peacekeeper sent by the Capitol to District 12.
 Honor Gillies as Barb Azure: A member of the Covey.
 Eike Onyambu as Tam Amber: A member of the Covey.
 Konstantin Taffet as Clerk Carmine: A member of the Covey.
 Michael Greco and Daniela Grubert as Strabo Plinth and Mrs. Plinth: Sejanus' parents.

Production

Development 
In August 2017, Lionsgate CEO Jon Feltheimer expressed interest in spin-offs of The Hunger Games film series, with intentions to form a writers' room to explore the concept.

In June 2019, Joe Drake, chairman of the Lionsgate's Motion Picture Group, announced that the company was working with author Suzanne Collins with regards to an adaptation of the novel The Ballad of Songbirds and Snakes. By April 2020, Collins and Lionsgate confirmed that plans were underway for the film's development. Francis Lawrence was later confirmed to direct, after doing so for the prior three films in the series. The screenplay was written by Collins, Michael Arndt, and Michael Lesslie, with Nina Jacobson and Brad Simpson as producers along with Lawrence. Collins, in addition, would serve as an executive producer on the film. In August 2021, Drake stated that the film was "moving along really, really well" in pre-production.

Casting 
In May 2022, Tom Blyth was cast as the young President Snow, with Rachel Zegler as his protégée, tribute Lucy Gray Baird. Zegler was originally offered the role in January, but initially turned it down before later changing her mind. In June 2022, Josh Andres Rivera (who previously starred in 2021's West Side Story alongside Zegler), Hunter Schafer and Jason Schwartzman were cast. Peter Dinklage was cast in the following month. Throughout June and July 2022, the cast was rounded out with actors portraying the film's multiple tributes and mentors. On August 15, 2022, it was reported that Viola Davis was cast as Volumnia Gaul, the head gamemaker of the 10th annual Hunger Games. On September 16, 2022, more cast members were revealed, including Burn Gorman and Fionnula Flanagan.

Filming 
Filming began in Wrocław, Poland on July 11, 2022 and ended in Berlin, Germany on November 5, 2022.

Release 
The film is expected to be released on November 17, 2023.

References

External links 
 
 

2023 films
2023 action films
2023 science fiction films
2020s English-language films
2020s science fiction adventure films
2020s science fiction drama films
2020s science fiction thriller films
2020s survival films
American action films
American dystopian films
American post-apocalyptic films
American science fiction adventure films
American science fiction drama films
American science fiction thriller films
American survival films
Films directed by Francis Lawrence
Films with screenplays by Michael Arndt
Lionsgate films
The Hunger Games
Upcoming prequel films
Films shot in Poland
2020s American films
American prequel films